Aivo Orav (born 10 April 1965 in Pärnu) is an Estonian diplomat. Mr. Aivo Orav is the Permanent Representative of Estonian to the EU since 2020. Before that, he has been the Head of EU Delegation in Montenegro and Head of EU Delegation in the Republic of North Macedonia, and Ambassador of Estonian in several countries.

Biography 
Aivo Orav (born April 10, 1965 in Pärnu) is an Estonian diplomat.

He graduated from the Faculty of Physics and Chemistry of the University of Tartu (1990) and later from the Estonian Diplomatic School in Tallinn (1992).

Orav has been in the service of the Ministry of Foreign Affairs since 1992. 

In the years 1995–1998, he worked in the Permanent Representation of Estonia at the Organizing of the Security and Cooperation in Europe (CSCE/OSCE) in Vienna.

From 1998 to 2000, he worked as the Security Policy Director of the Ministry of Foreign Affairs.

In the years 2000–2005, Orav was the Ambassador of Estonia in Poland with co-accreditation to Bulgaria and Romania. Since 2005, Orav is the non-resident ambassador in Macedonia. 

After the end of his term in Poland in August 2005, Orav returned to Estonia, where he  worked as the Political Director of the Ministry of Foreign Affairs.

2008-2012 Orav was the Estonian Ambassador to Turkey with co-accreditation to Azerbaijan, Lebanon and Macedonia.

2012 Orav joined the EU External Action Service and worked as EU Ambassador to North Macedonia until 2016 and then as EU Ambassador to Montenegro 2016-2020.

Orav is Estonian Permanent Representative to the European Union since September 2020.

Diplomatic posts

 2000–2005 Ambassador of Estonia to Poland
 2005–2012 Ambassador of Estonia to the Republic of North Macedonia (residing in Poland, Estonia, Turkey)
 2008–2012 Ambassador of Estonia to Turkey
 2012-2016 EU Ambassador to the Republic of North Macedonia 
 2016-2020 EU Ambassador to Montenegro
 Since 2020 – Ambassador of Estonia, Permanent Representative (Permanent Representation of Estonia to the EU)

Awards 
 2002: Krzyź Komandorski z Gwiazda Orderu Zazługi Rzeczypospolitej Polskiej
 2005: Order of the White Star, IV class.
 2005: Order of The Madara Horseman, 1st Class, Bulgaria

References

Living people
1965 births
Estonian diplomats
Ambassadors of Estonia to Poland
Ambassadors of Estonia to North Macedonia
Ambassadors of Estonia to Turkey
University of Tartu alumni
People from Pärnu